Open Data Buffalo is the open data program developed under the administration of Mayor Byron W. Brown in Buffalo, New York. The initiative is a commitment to proactively release high-quality, updated "publishable City data" through a centralized portal in machine-readable formats, fully accessible and freely available in the public domain. Open Data Buffalo is an official City program designed to foster transparency, innovation, accountability, and efficiency.

History 

In May 2013, Buffalo earned a grant through IBM's Smarter Cities Challenge to bring a team of senior IBM executives to the city to offer advice on improving municipal policy with data-driven insights. One of their primary recommendations was for Buffalo to build capacity in "data-sharing and governance." Three years later, Buffalo joined the national network of Bloomberg Philanthropies What Works Cities to expand their use of data. With the support of What Works Cities, Buffalo partnered with The Sunlight Foundation to craft an Open Data Policy with input from the public using the Madison tool, an open source platform provided by OpenGov Foundation.

In September 2017, the City of Buffalo selected Socrata as the provider for the municipality's open data platform. The city launched the Open Data Buffalo portal on February 22, 2018  and kicked off the launch with the open of Mayor Byron W. Brown's Civic Innovation Challenge Powered By AT&T, a tech competition designed to promote local engagement with the portal. The competition's challenge statement asks innovators to use City data to create solutions to address social and civic issues impacting Buffalo residents.

Datasets

As of October 2019, the Open Data Buffalo data catalog is federated with the New York State portal and includes over 654 data sets and 222 geospatial assets, over 60 of which are City publications. Buffalo's datasets and geospatial assets include:

References 

Open data